William Williams (28 March 1774 – 8 February 1839) was an English politician who was Whig Member of Parliament for Weymouth and Melcombe Regis from 1818 to 1826.

References 

1774 births
1839 deaths

19th-century British politicians
Members of the Parliament of the United Kingdom for Weymouth and Melcombe Regis
Whig (British political party) MPs for English constituencies
UK MPs 1818–1820
UK MPs 1820–1826
Burials in Dorset